A geographical indication (GI) is a name or sign used on products which corresponds to a specific geographical location or origin (e.g., a town, region, or country). The use of a geographical indication, as an indication of the product's source, is intended as a certification that the product possesses certain qualities, is made according to traditional methods, or enjoys a good reputation due to its geographical origin.

Article 22.1 of the TRIPS Agreement defines geographical indications as "...indications which identify a good as originating in the territory of a Member [of the World Trade Organization], or a region or locality in that territory, where a given quality, reputation or other characteristic of the good is essentially attributable to its geographical origin."

Appellation d'origine contrôlée ('Appellation of origin') is a sub-type of geographical indication where quality, method, and reputation of a product originate from a strictly defined area specified in its intellectual property right registration.

History
Governments have protected trade names and trademarks of food products identified with a particular region since at least the end of the 19th century, using laws against false trade descriptions or passing off, which generally protects against suggestions that a product has a certain origin, quality, or association when it does not. In such cases, the limitation on competitive freedoms which results from the grant of a monopoly of use over a geographical indication is justified by governments either by consumer protection benefits or by producer protection benefits.

One of the first GI systems is the one used in France from the early part of the 20th century known as appellation d'origine contrôlée (AOC). Items that meet geographical origin and quality standards may be endorsed with a government-issued stamp which acts as official certification of the origins and standards of the product. Examples of products that have such "appellations of origin" include Gruyère cheese (from Switzerland) and many French wines.

Under "" of the 1919 Treaty of Versailles, Germany was forbidden from using allied geographical indications on products, which in particular affected the German "cognac" and "champagne" industries, as the French considered the terms misleading references to places in France. Since then, the terms "Weinbrand" and "Sekt" have been used instead.

Geographical indications have long been associated with the concept of terroir and with Europe as an entity, where there is a tradition of associating certain food products with particular regions. Under European Union Law, the protected designation of origin framework which came into effect in 1992 regulates the following systems of geographical indications: "Protected designation of origin" (PDO), "protected geographical indication" (PGI), and Traditional Specialities Guaranteed" (TSG).

Areas covered 
The use of geographical indications is not limited to agricultural products. A geographical indication may also highlight specific qualities of a product that are due to human factors found in the product’s place of origin, such as specific manufacturing skills and traditions. For example handicrafts, which are generally handmade using local natural resources and usually embedded in the traditions of local communities.

Differences between geographical indications and other protections

Trademarks 
Geographical indications and trademarks are distinctive signs used to distinguish goods or services in the marketplace. Both convey information about the origin of a good or service, and enable consumers to associate a particular quality with a good or service. Trademarks inform consumers about the source of a good or service. They identify a good or service as originating from a particular company. Trademarks help consumers associate a good or service with a specific quality or reputation, based on information about the company responsible for producing or offering it. Geographical indications identify a good as originating from a particular place. Based on its place of origin, consumers may associate a good with a particular quality, characteristic or reputation. A trademark often consists of an arbitrary sign that may be used by its owner or another person authorized to do so. A trademark can be assigned or licensed to anyone, anywhere in the world, because it is linked to a specific company and not to a particular place. In contrast, the sign used to denote a geographical indication usually corresponds to the name of the place of origin of the good, or to the name by which the good is known in that place. A geographical indication may be used by all persons who, in the area of origin, produce the good according to specified standards. However, because of its link with the place of origin, a geographical indication cannot be assigned or licensed to someone outside that place or not belonging to the group of authorized producers.

Appellation of origin 
Appellations of origin are a special kind of geographical indication. The term is used in the Paris Convention and defined in the Lisbon Agreement. Article 2 of the Lisbon Agreement defines appellations of origin as“(1)... the geographical denomination of a country, region, or locality, which serves to designate a product originating therein, the quality or characteristics of which are due exclusively or essentially to the geographical environment, including natural and human factors.” This definition suggests that appellations of origin consist of the name of the product’s place of origin. However, it is interesting to note that a number of traditional indications that are not place names, but refer to a product in connection with a place, are protected as appellations of origin under the Lisbon Agreement (for example, Reblochon (cheese) and Vinho Verde (green wine)).It is sometimes argued that products with a certain reputation, but no other quality due to their place of origin are not considered appellations of origin under the Lisbon Agreement. However, this interpretation is not universally accepted.

Nevertheless, appellations of origin and geographical indications both require a qualitative link between the product to which they refer and its place of origin. Both inform consumers about a product’s geographical origin and a quality or characteristic of the product linked to its place of origin. The basic difference between the two terms is that the link with the place of origin must be stronger in the case of an appellation of origin. The quality or characteristics of a product protected as an appellation of origin must result exclusively or essentially from its geographical origin. This generally means that the raw materials should be sourced in the place of origin and that the processing of the product should also happen there. In the case of geographical indications, a single criterion attributable to geographical origin is sufficient, be it a quality or other characteristic of the product, or only its reputation. Moreover, the production of the raw materials and the development or processing of a GI product do not necessarily take place entirely in the defined geographical area.The term appellation of origin is often used in laws that establish a specific right and system of protection for geographical indications, in so-called sui generis systems of protection (see the section on how to obtain protection for geographical indications). Geographical indication is a more general concept that does not determine a specific mode of protection.

Rural development effects

Geographical indications are generally applied to traditional products, produced by rural, marginal or indigenous communities over generations, that have gained a reputation on the local, national or international markets due to their specific unique qualities.

Producers can add value to their products through Geographical Indications by:
 communicating to consumers the product's characteristics, which derive from the climate, soil and other natural conditions in its particular geographical area;
 promoting the conservation of local traditional production processes; and 
 protecting and adding value to the cultural identity of local communities.

The recognition and protection on the markets of the names of these products allows the community of producers to invest in maintaining the specific qualities of the product on which the reputation is built. Most importantly, as the reputation spreads beyond borders and demand grows, investment may be directed to the sustainablity of the environment where these products originate and are produced. In the International Trade Centre's "Guide to Geographical Indications: Linking Products and their Origins", authors Daniele Giovannucci, Professor Tim Josling, William Kerr, Bernard O'Connor and May T. Yeung clearly assert that geographical indications are by no means a panacea for the difficulties of rural development. They can however offer a comprehensive framework for rural development, since they can positively encompass issues of economic competitiveness, stakeholder equity, environmental stewardship, and socio-cultural value. The application of circular economy will ensure socio-economic returns in the long-run to avoid growth at an environmental cost. This approach for GI development may also allow for investment together with  promoting the reputation of the product along the lines of sustainability when and where possible.

Rural development impacts from geographical indications, referring to environmental protection, economic development and social well-being, can be:
the strengthening of sustainable local food production and supply (except for non-agricultural GIs such as handicrafts);
a structuring of the supply chain around a common product reputation linked to origin;
greater bargaining power to raw material producers for better distribution so as for them to receive a higher retail price benefit percentage;
capacity of producers to invest economic gains into higher quality to access niche markets, improving circular economy means throughout the value chain, protection against infringements such as free-riding from illegitimate producers, etc.;
economic resilience in terms of increased and stabilised prices for the GI product to avoid the commodity trap through de-commodisation, or to prevent/minimise external shocks affecting the premium price percentage gains (usually varying from 20-25%);
added value throughout the supply chain;
spill-over effects such as new business and even other GI registrations;
preservation of the natural resources on which the product is based and therefore protect the environment;
preservation of traditions and traditional knowledge;
identity based prestige;
linkages to tourism.

None of these impacts are guaranteed and they depend on numerous factors, including the process of developing the geographical indications, the type and effects of the association of stakeholders, the rules for using the GI (or Code of Practice), the inclusiveness and quality of the collective dimension decision making of the GI producers association and quality of the marketing efforts undertaken.

International issues

Like trademarks, geographical indications are regulated locally by each country because conditions of registration such as differences in the generic use of terms vary from country to country. This is especially true of food and beverage names which frequently use geographical terms, but it may also be true of other products such as carpets (e.g. 'Shiraz'), handicrafts, flowers and perfumes.

When products with GIs acquire a reputation of international magnitude, some other products may try to pass themselves off as the authentic GI products. This kind of competition is often seen as unfair, as it may discourage traditional producers as well as mislead consumers. Thus the European Union has pursued efforts to improve the protection of GI internationally. Inter alia, the European Union has established distinct legislation to protect geographical names in the fields of wines, spirits, agricultural products including beer. A register for protected geographical indications and denominations of origin relating to products in the field of agriculture including beer, but excluding mineral water, was established (DOOR). Another register was set up for wine region names, namely the E-Bacchus register. In November 2020, the European Union Intellectual Property Office launched the comprehensive database GI View covering food, wine, and spirit GIs. A private database project (GEOPRODUCT directory) intends to provide worldwide coverage. Accusations of 'unfair' competition should although be levelled with caution since the use of GIs sometimes comes from European immigrants who brought their traditional methods and skills with them.

Paris convention and Lisbon agreement

International trade made it important to try to harmonize the different approaches and standards that governments used to register GIs. The first attempts to do so were found in the Paris Convention on trademarks (1883, still in force, 176 members), followed by a much more elaborate provision in the 1958 Lisbon Agreement on the Protection of Appellations of Origin and their Registration. About 9000 geographical indications were registered by Lisbon Agreement members.

Agreement on Trade-Related Aspects of Intellectual Property Rights

The WTO Agreement on Trade-Related Aspects of Intellectual Property Rights ("TRIPS") defines "geographical indications" as indications that identify a good as "originating in the territory of a Member, or a region or locality in that territory, where a given quality, reputation or other characteristic of the good is essentially attributable to its geographic origin."

In 1994, when negotiations on the WTO TRIPS were concluded, governments of all WTO member countries (164 countries, as of  August 2016) had agreed to set certain basic standards for the protection of GIs in all member countries. There are, in effect, two basic obligations on WTO member governments relating to GIs in the TRIPS agreement:

 Article 22 of the TRIPS Agreement says that all governments must provide legal opportunities in their own laws for the owner of a GI registered in that country to prevent the use of marks that mislead the public as to the geographical origin of the good. This includes prevention of use of a geographical name which although literally true "falsely represents" that the product comes from somewhere else.
 Article 23 of the TRIPS Agreement says that all governments must provide the owners of GI the right, under their laws, to prevent the use of a geographical indication identifying wines not originating in the place indicated by the geographical indication. This applies even where the public is not being misled, where there is no unfair competition and where the true origin of the good is indicated or the geographical indication is accompanied by expressions such as "kind", "type", "style", "imitation" or the like. Similar protection must be given to geographical indications identifying spirits.

Article 22 of TRIPS also says that governments may refuse to register a trademark or may invalidate an existing trademark (if their legislation permits or at the request of another government) if it misleads the public as to the true origin of a good. Article 23 says governments may refuse to register or may invalidate a trademark that conflicts with a wine or spirits GI whether the trademark misleads or not.

Article 24 of TRIPS provides a number of exceptions to the protection of geographical indications that are particularly relevant for geographical indications for wines and spirits (Article 23). For example, Members are not obliged to bring a geographical indication under protection where it has become a generic term for describing the product in question. Measures to implement these provisions should not prejudice prior trademark rights that have been acquired in good faith; and, under certain circumstances — including long-established use — continued use of a geographical indication for wines or spirits may be allowed on a scale and nature as before.

In the Doha Development Round of WTO negotiations, launched in December 2001, WTO member governments are negotiating on the creation of a 'multilateral register' of geographical indications. Some countries, including the EU, are pushing for a register with legal effect, while other countries, including the United States, are pushing for a non-binding system under which the WTO would simply be notified of the members' respective geographical indications.

Some governments participating in the negotiations (especially the European Communities) wish to go further and negotiate the inclusion of GIs on products other than wines and spirits under Article 23 of TRIPS. These governments argue that extending Article 23 will increase the protection of these marks in international trade. This is a controversial proposal, however, that is opposed by other governments including the United States who question the need to extend the stronger protection of Article 23 to other products. They are concerned that Article 23 protection is greater than required, in most cases, to deliver the consumer benefit that is the fundamental objective of GIs laws.

Geneva Act of the Lisbon Agreement
In 2015, The Geneva Act was adopted. It entered into force early-2020 with the accession of the European Union. The Geneva Act bridges the Lisbon system of Appellations of Origin, and the TRIPS system of Geographical Indications.

Differences in philosophy
One reason for the conflicts that occur between European and United States governments is a difference in philosophy as to what constitutes a "genuine" product. In Europe, the prevailing theory is that of terroir: that there is a specific property of a geographical area, and that dictates a strict usage of geographical designations. Thus, anyone with sheep of the right breeds can make Roquefort cheese if they are located in the part of France where that cheese is made, but nobody outside that part of France can make a blue sheep's milk cheese and call it Roquefort, even if they completely duplicate the process described in the definition of Roquefort. By contrast, in the United States, the naming is generally considered to be a matter of intellectual property. Thus, the name Grayson belongs to Meadowcreek Farms, and they have to a right to use it as a trademark. Nobody, even in Grayson County, Virginia, can call their cheese Grayson, while Meadowcreek Farms, if they bought up another farm elsewhere in the United States, even if nowhere near Grayson County, could use that name. It is considered that their need to preserve their reputation as a company is the quality guarantee. This difference causes most of the conflict between the United States and Europe in their attitudes toward geographical names.

However, there is some overlap, particularly with American products adopting a European way of viewing the matter. The most notable of these are crops: Vidalia onions, Florida oranges, and Idaho potatoes. In each of these cases, the state governments of Georgia, Florida, and Idaho registered trademarks, and then allowed their growers—or in the case of the Vidalia onion, only those in a certain, well-defined geographical area within the state—to use the term, while denying its use to others. The European conception is increasingly gaining acceptance in American viticulture; also, vintners in the various American Viticultural Areas are attempting to form well-developed and unique identities as New World wine gains acceptance in the wine community. Finally, the United States has a long tradition of placing relatively strict limitations on its native forms of whiskey; particularly notable are the requirements for labeling a product "straight whiskey" (which requires the whiskey to be produced in the United States in accordance with certain standards) and the requirement, enforced by federal law and several international agreements, (NAFTA, among them) that a product labeled Tennessee whiskey be a straight Bourbon whiskey produced in the state of Tennessee.

Conversely, some European products have adopted a more American system: a prime example is Newcastle Brown Ale, which received an EU protected geographical status in 2000. When the brewery moved from Tyneside to Tadcaster in North Yorkshire (about 150 km away) in 2007 for economic reasons, the status had to be revoked.

See also

 Appellation (wine)
 Country of origin
 Geographical Indication Registry (India)
 Geographical Indications of Goods (Registration and Protection) Act, 1999
 Protected Geographical Status (European Union)
 Terroir

Notes
1.See also the Paris Convention, the Madrid Agreement, the Lisbon Agreement, the Geneva Act.

Sources

References

Further reading 
 Baeumer, Ludwig, “Protection of Geographical Indications under WIPO Treaties and Questions Concerning the Relationship Between Those Treaties and the TRIPS Agreement,” in Symposium on the Protection of Geographical Indications in the Worldwide Context (held in Eger, Hungary, October 24/25, 1997), WIPO publication No. 760(E), Geneva, 1999.
 Bramley, Cerkia, Estelle Biénabe, and Johann Kirsten, “The Economics of Geographical Indications: Towards a Conceptual Framework for Geographical Indication Research in Developing Countries,” in The Economics of Intellectual Property, WIPO, 2009.
 Giovannucci, Daniele et al., Guide to Geographical Indications, Linking Products and their Origins, International Trade Centre (ITC), Geneva, 2009.
 Rangnekar, Dwijen, The Socio-Economics of Geographical Indications: A Review of Empirical Evidence from Europe, UNCTAD-ICTSD Project on IPTs and Sustainable Development Series, Issue Paper 8, 2004.
 Vandecandelaere, Emilie et al., Linking People, Places and Products, jointly published by the Food and Agriculture Organization of the United Nations (FAO) and SINER-GI, FAO, 2009.
 United Nations Industrial Development Organization (UNIDO), Adding Value to Traditional Products of Regional Origin: A Guide to Creating a Quality Consortium, Vienna, 2010.
 World Trade Organization (WTO), “Review under Article 24.2 of the Application of the Provisions of the Section of the TRIPS Agreement on Geographical Indications,” WTO document IP/C/W/253/Rev.1, 2003. 
 WIPO: SCT/3/6: Geographical Indications.
 WIPO: SCT/5/3: Conflicts between Trademarks and GIs, Conflicts between Homonymous 
 WIPO: GIs.SCT/8/4: Geographical Indications, Historic Background, Nature of the Right, Existing Systems of Protection, Obtaining Protection in Other Countries.
 WIPO: SCT/9/4: The Definition of Geographical Indications.

External links
 FAO guide: Linking people, places and products (2009)
 Organization for an International Geographical Indications Network
 World Intellectual Property Organization (WIPO): Geographical Indications
 Caslon Analytics Appellations
 Wines and mangoes as geographical Indications 
 A research project on geographical indications

European Union food law
Geographical indications